Gurudeva is a 2005 Indian romantic drama film directed by Jaffer. The music by Sabesh–Murali and produced by K. Kaliyamurthy. The film stars Jai Akash, along with Pranathi, Nassar, and Riyaz Khan. The film was filmed simultaneously in Tamil and Telugu as Guru. This film was released on  1 April 2005 under the banner of Sriselva Muthukumara Movies.

Plot 

The movie is about a street rowdy's love for a rich heiress. Guru (Jai Akash) is a street rowdy who hangs out in a mechanic shop owned by Mari (Nassar), a handicapped man who is the advisor to Guru. They lead a happy life. Deva (Pranathi) falls in love with him. Later they both decide to marry.

Cast 

 Jai Akash as Guru
 Pranathi as Deva
 Nassar as Mari
 Riyaz Khan as Deva's unwanted suitor
 Vijayakumar as Sundar (cameo appearance)
 Pandu
 Devadarshini as Deva's friend
 Madhan Bob as Doctor

Tamil version
 Dhamu as Poonai
 Muthukaalai as Guru's friend
 Vaiyapuri as Guru's friend
 Sabesh Karthik as Guru's friend
 Ilavarasu as Police officer
 Omakuchi Narasimhan
 Chelladurai
 Kovai Senthil as Priest
Telugu version
Srinivasa Reddy
Chitram Seenu as Guru's friend
Gautam Raju as Police officer

Production 
During the making of the Telugu version, an intimate scene was filmed between Jai Akash and Pranathi in the presence of the assistant director. Since the assistant director was unsatisfied with the shot, the shot was taken eight times. Jai Akash said that the scene was filmed enough times, and he slapped the assistant director after the assistant director did not agree.

Soundtrack 
Music by Sabesh–Murali.
"Aanandham Aanandham" – Tippu, Mathangi
"Saiva Karuvadu" – Sabash, Manikka Vinayagam, Srilekha Parthasarathy
"Azhage Azhage" – Srinivas, Anuradha Sriram
"Silenta Sirichu" – Karthik, Pop Shalini
"Manakudhada" – Tippu

Release and reception 
The film was scheduled to release on February 14, but was delayed. A critic from Sify opined that "There is nothing new in the way if presentation and music director Sabesh Murali rehashes old ?gana? songs of Deva". Balaji Balasubramaniam of BBThots gave the  film a rating of one out of five stars and opined that "Gurudeva badly needs a revamp of its screenplay And as long as they are rewriting it, they should consider hiring someone who actually knows how to write one!". The film released alongside the low budget films Girivalam and Thaka Thimi Tha and did not fare well at the box office.

The film was released in Telugu as Guru in June 2005. Since the Telugu version failed due to lack of publicity, Jai Akash went to the Telugu producer Muppa Ankanna Rao's house and threatened him. Akash was subsequently sent to jail and released after a compromise was made.

References 

2005 films
2000s Tamil-language films
2000s Telugu-language films
Indian multilingual films